Plex Moss Lane Halt was a railway station between Halsall and Barton in Lancashire. The station opened in July 1906 as a halt on the Liverpool, Southport and Preston Junction Railway, and consisted of simple cinder based platforms at track level which required steps to be lowered from the coach for passenger access. It was situated to the south of the road bridge on Plex Moss Lane, to which it was connected by wooden steps. The station closed to passengers on 26 September 1938 and the tracks were lifted shortly after the line closed in 1952.

In 2015 the bridge and trackbed were plainly visible, the latter as a wide band of mature trees.

References

Sources

External links 
 Plex Moss Lane Halt via Disused Stations
 The line and mileages via Railwaycodes

Disused railway stations in the Borough of West Lancashire
Former Lancashire and Yorkshire Railway stations
Railway stations in Great Britain opened in 1906
Railway stations in Great Britain closed in 1938
Halsall